Eskelabad (also Romanized as Eskelābād and Eskalābād) is a village in Eskelabad Rural District, Nukabad District, Khash County, Sistan and Baluchestan Province, Iran. At the 2006 census, its population was 604, in 149 families.

References 

Populated places in Khash County